The Dove Marine Laboratory is a research and teaching laboratory which forms part of the School of Marine Science and Technology within Newcastle University in the United Kingdom.

History 
The original Laboratory was established in October 1897.  It comprised a small wooden hut sited next to the Saltwater Baths on Cullercoats Bay, and was used by Armstrong College to study the waters of the north east UK coastline.

On the 28 March 1904 the Laboratory and Baths were destroyed by fire, but it was agreed that the work of the Laboratory should continue.  In 1906 the local landowner, geologist Wilfred Hudleston, FRS, offered not only to make the site of the old Baths available for newer, larger, facilities, but also offered to finance their construction.  He was reluctant to publicise his generosity, and asked that the building be named after one of his ancestors, Eleanor Dove, when it was opened by the Duke of Northumberland on 29 September 1908. In 2008 the laboratory celebrated its centenary, where the current Duke of Northumberland led festivities.

The Laboratory became a department of Armstrong College when the building and land were purchased by the college following Hudleston's death in 1909, and soon grew in reputation, acquiring its first boat in 1911.  The Laboratory also operated a public aquarium and once housed the coble in which Grace Darling and her father rescued passengers from the SS Forfashire in 1838.

In 1967 responsibility for the Laboratory was transferred to Newcastle University.
At one point the entrance was a long beam that had to be walked across.

Present Day 

As a research facility the Laboratory is normally closed to the public, but holds open days during the summer months and as part of other events such as Cullercoats Harbour Day and Heritage Open Days.

A Marine Science distance learning course, Delve Deeper, run by the University includes a field course component based at the laboratory.

Research Vessels of the Dove Marine Laboratory 
 The Evadne: 1911 –
 Pandalus: 1950s
 The Alexander Meek: 1950s – 1973
 RV Bernicia: 1973 – 2011
 RV The Princess Royal: 2011 – present

References

External links 
 School of Engineering
 Dove web site at the University of Newcastle

Oceanographic organizations
Marine biological stations
Education in Newcastle upon Tyne
Newcastle University
University and college laboratories in the United Kingdom
1897 establishments in England
North Shields